Xylota angustiventris, (Loew, 1866), the  Two-spotted Leafwalker , is an uncommon species of syrphid fly observed in northeast North America. Syrphid flies are also known as Hover Flies or Flower Flies because the adults are frequently found hovering around flowers from which they feed on nectar and pollen. The larvae are not known, but in this genus, are likely to be found in tree holes or bark  to feed on sap.

Distribution
Canada, United States.

References

Eristalinae
Insects described in 1866
Diptera of North America
Hoverflies of North America
Taxa named by Hermann Loew